The Better Angels Society is a 501(c)3 organization that was founded in 2013 by supporters of Ken Burns to raise funds from individuals of wealth and private family foundations. Amy Margerum Berg has served as the organization's president since 2016.

The Better Angels Society describes its mission as ensuring “historically significant films are completed, broadcast, promoted, and shared in ways that reach and inform as many people as possible through robust educational and civic outreach” and “that the next generation of documentary filmmakers, inspired by Ken Burns and his team, receive the education, mentoring, training, and support they need to continue his legacy.”

The Library of Congress Lavine/Ken Burns Prize for Film 

In 2019, a partnership between The Better Angels Society, the Library of Congress, and the Crimson Lion Foundation announced the creation of the Library of Congress Lavine/Ken Burns Prize for Film, an award “to recognize exemplary accomplishment in historical documentaries,” and “to recognize a filmmaker whose documentary uses original research and compelling narrative to tell stories that touch on some aspect of American history.” The grant is funded by Jeannie Lavine and her husband Jonathan Lavine, co-managing partner of Bain Capital through a $15 million gift to The Better Angels Society.

The winner receives a $200,000 finishing grant to help with the final production of the film. In its first year, eighty films were submitted; 10 films were then reviewed by an internal committee and six finalists were reviewed by a National Jury. The winner was selected by Librarian of Congress Carla Hayden in consultation with Burns.

The first winner of the prize was “Flannery,” a film on Southern Gothic writer Flannery O’Connor by filmmakers Elizabeth Coffman and Mark Bosco. The film is expected to stream in virtual theaters in 2020. The runner-up was “Mae West: Dirty Blonde,” a film on actress Mae West that premiered as part of PBS American Masters on June 16, 2020.

Other finalists included “The Adventures of Saul Bellow” by Asaf Galay, “The First Angry Man” by Jason Cohn, “Mr. Soul!” by Melissa Haizlip and Sam Pollard, and “9 to 5: The Story of a Movement” by Academy Award-winning filmmakers Steven Bognar and Julia Reichert.

In 2022, the prize had its first tie with Bella! from Jeff L. Lieberman and Jamila C. Fairley winning alongside Philly on Fire from Ross Hockrow and Tommy Walker.

Next Generation Angels Awards 

Alongside the Library of Congress Lavine/Ken Burns Prize for film, The Better Angels Society launched the Next Generation Angels Awards as a youth component to the larger prize, recognizing six individual documentary filmmakers in the junior and senior high school divisions, in partnership with National History Day. The winner of the Senior division receive the Anne Harrington Award, named for a late longtime friend and colleague of Ken Burns. All winners were brought to Washington D.C. to attend film screenings, an awards ceremony and tours of archives at such facilities as the American Film Institute and the Library of Congress.

Educational Outreach 

In 2017, philanthropist David Rubenstein, through The Better Angels Society, pledged to support the launch of UNUM, a digital platform where users can access clips from across Burns's films, explore themes that run through American history, and relate them to issues of the present. The Better Angels Society also helped support the development of the Ken Burns Classroom on PBS Learning Media, which launched in 2019.

Georgetown University Events 

In 2019, The Better Angels Society launched a partnership with Georgetown University, which began with events featuring Ken Burns and Lynn Novick previewing her film series “College Behind Bars.” Georgetown and The Better Angels Society hosted another event in 2020 featuring Burns in a conversation around immigration.

Trademark Dispute 

In 2019, the United States District Court for the Southern District of New York ruled in favor of The Better Angels Society on its trademark infringement claims against New York-based nonprofit Institute for American Values, which launched its own Better Angels initiative after the 2016 presidential election as a grassroots effort to “reunify Red and Blue America.” The case was noted for demonstrating that the need to defend trademark rights extends to charitable nonprofits, so that donors know which organization they are supporting.

Films Supported 

 Prohibition (2011)
 The Dust Bowl (2012)
 The Central Park Five (2012)
 The Address (2014)
 The Roosevelts: An Intimate History (2014)
 Jackie Robinson (2016)
 Defying the Nazis: The Sharps' War (2016)
 The Vietnam War (2017)
 The Mayo Clinic: Faith - Hope - Science (2018)
 College Behind Bars (2019)
 Country Music (2019)
 9to5: The Story of a Movement (2020)
 The U.S. and the Holocaust (2022)

References 

501(c)(3) organizations
2013 establishments